Bertrand Ketchanke (born 14 June 1980) is a former professional footballer who is played as a defender. Born in Cameroon, he was a youth international for France and made one appearance for the Mauritania senior national team.

Career
Ketchanke started his career with French Ligue 1 side Rennes. In 1999, he was sent on loan to  Reims in the French third division. In 2004, Ketchanke signed for English fifth division side Scarborough. In 2005, he signed for Institute in Northern Ireland but left due to being threatened. In 2010, he signed for French club Borgo.

Before the second half of 2011–12, Ketchanke signed for BX Brussels in the Belgian third division. In 2013, he signed for Luxembourgish third division team US Esch. In 2014, he signed for CS Pétange in the Luxembourgish second division. In 2015, Ketchanke signed for Belgian outfit .

References

External links
 

Mauritania international footballers
Living people
Expatriate footballers in England
Association football defenders
French sportspeople of Cameroonian descent
Mauritanian expatriate footballers
Mauritanian footballers
French footballers
French expatriate sportspeople in England
French expatriate sportspeople in Luxembourg
French expatriate sportspeople in Northern Ireland
Institute F.C. players
1980 births
Expatriate footballers in Belgium
Stade de Reims players
Stade Rennais F.C. players
Borgo FC players
Championnat National 3 players
Scarborough F.C. players
NIFL Premiership players
Expatriate association footballers in Northern Ireland
CS Pétange players
BX Brussels players
Expatriate footballers in Luxembourg
French expatriate sportspeople in Belgium
French expatriate footballers